Big Brother Brasil 8 was the eighth season of Big Brother Brasil which premiered January 8, 2008 with the season finale airing March 25, 2008 on the Rede Globo television network.

The show is produced by Endemol Globo and presented by news reporter Pedro Bial. The season was officially confirmed since 2001 as part of the original contract between international Endemol and Rede Globo that provided seasons until 2008.

The grand prize was R$1 million with tax allowances, with a R$100,000 prize offered to the runner up and a R$50,000 prize offered to the 3rd place. In the end, 26-year-old musician Rafinha Ribeiro from Campinas, SP, won the competition over student Gyselle Soares with 50.15% of the final vote. There were 75 million votes cast on the season finale, the show's record at the time.

Overview
There were fourteen housemates competing for the grand prize, a decrease over the previous season. The season introduced the Big Phone and the Have and Have-Nots concept. It lasted 78 days, a decrease of one week over the previous season.

Controversy
On week 7, journalism student and housemate Juliana Góes fainted inside a glass chamber during a HoH endurance competition. Newspapers and websites proclaimed Big Brother Brasil to be inhumane. However, the show was unaffected by the negative press.

Housemates
The cast list was unveiled on January 3, 2008.

(ages stated at time of contest)

Future appearances
In 2010, Natália Casassola was contender to be a competitor on Big Brother Brasil 10, but ultimately did not return, eventually in 2013 she returned in Big Brother Brasil 13 and finished in 4th place.

Voting history

Notes

Have and Have-Nots

References

External links
 Big Brother Brasil 8
 Terra: BBB8

2008 Brazilian television seasons
08